Evgeny Donskoy and Mikhail Elgin were the defending champions but chose not to defend their title.

Sander Gillé and Joran Vliegen won the title after defeating Sander Arends and Antonio Šančić 6–3, 6–7(1–7), [10–7] in the final.

Seeds

Draw

References
 Main Draw

Open de Rennes - Doubles
2018 Doubles